Carlos Peña (born 1978) is a  baseball first baseman.

Carlos Peña may also refer to:

 Carlos Peña González (born 1959), Chilean lawyer, philosopher and sociologist 
 Carlos Peña (Spanish  footballer) (born 1983), footballer
 Carlos Peña (singer) (born 1988), Guatemalan singer and songwriter
 Carlos PenaVega (born 1989), American actor and singer
 Carlos Peña (Mexican footballer) (born 1990), footballer